Grand Junction High School (GJHS) is a public high school located in Grand Junction, Colorado, United States. It is part of the Mesa County Valley School District 51. It is one of four high schools located within the Grand Valley.

History
Originally founded in 1891, the school has been located at its current location on Fifth St. since 1956. In early 2022; an entirely new GJHS school building began construction, after the building is finished, the original building will be demolished.

As of 2021, the student-teacher ratio was approximately 17:1.

A wall of the school was signed by U.S President Barack Obama in 2013.

Athletics
Grand Junction's chosen athletic rival is Fruita Monument High School. Some of the sports Grand Junction offers are:

 Baseball (boys')
 Basketball (boys' and girls')
 Cheerleading
 Cross country (boys' and girls')
 Football (boys')
 Golf (boys' and girls')
 Lacrosse (boys' and girls')
 Pom Squad
 Soccer (boys' and girls')
 Softball (girls')
 Swimming (boys' and girls')
 Tennis (boys' and girls')
 Track (boys' and girls')
 Volleyball (girls')
 Wrestling (boys')

Student publications
The school publishes a newspaper, The Orange and Black, as well as a yearbook, The Tiger.

Notable alumni
 Paul Briggs - NFL tackle for the Detroit Lions
 Chuck Cottier - major league baseball player, scout, and coach
 Marques Harris - NFL linebacker for the San Diego Chargers
 Monica Marquez - Associate Justice of the Colorado Supreme Court
 Bill Musgrave -  NFL quarterback and coach
 Josh Penry - politician
 Michael Strobl - author and USMC Officer
 Dalton Trumbo - author and Hollywood screenwriter
 Andrew Walter - NFL quarterback for the Oakland Raiders

See also
 List of high schools in Colorado
 List of high schools in Mesa County, Colorado

References

External links
 
 Mesa County Valley School District official website

Public high schools in Colorado
Grand Junction, Colorado
Schools in Mesa County, Colorado